Francis Curzon (by 1523 – 1591/1592) was an English politician.

He was a Member (MP) of the Parliament of England for Derbyshire in April 1554 and 1571.

References

1592 deaths
English MPs 1554
Year of birth uncertain
English MPs 1571